The Arrows A6 was a Formula One car which the Arrows team used to compete in the  and  Formula One seasons. It was designed by Dave Wass and powered by the Cosworth DFY V8 engine. The A6 used a honeycomb monocoque frame, as a carbon fibre chassis was too expensive.

Drivers of the A6 at various times included Marc Surer, Chico Serra, Thierry Boutsen and  World Drivers' Champion Alan Jones.

The A6 was replaced during the  season by the team's first turbocharged car, the A7.

An Arrows A6 was entered by Roger Cowman in the 1985 Formula 3000 championship for Slim Borgudd.

Complete Formula One results
(key)

References

See also 
 Historic Formula One Championship
 1983 Race of Champions

A06